JaNardreon Quonshun "J. J." Jones, (born December 6, 1992) is an American football wide receiver and return specialist who is a free agent. He played college football for the West Georgia Wolves.

College career
Jones began his collegiate career at Itawamba Community College as a walk-on. He transferred to West Georgia for his final two years of collegiate eligibility. As a redshirt senior, Jones caught 24 passes for 274 yards and two touchdowns and returned 28 punts for 293 yards and a touchdown.

Professional career

Los Angeles Chargers
Jones was signed by the Los Angeles Chargers as undrafted free agent on May 11, 2018. Jones made the Chargers 53-man roster as the primary kick and punt returner following an impressive preseason, which included a 72-yard punt return touchdown. He made his NFL debut in the Chargers' season-opening loss to the Kansas City Chiefs. He had two kick returns for 36 net yards. He was waived by the Chargers on October 11, 2018.

New York Jets
Jones was signed to the New York Jets' practice squad on October 22, 2018. He was promoted to the active roster on December 29, 2018. Jones played in the Jets season finale against the New England Patriots and caught a three-yard pass from quarterback Sam Darnold for his first career reception. Jones played in four games during his rookie season (three with the Chargers and one with the Jets), recording 93 total return yards and one reception for three yards, as well as two fumbles.

On August 23, 2019, Jones was waived by the Jets.

Edmonton Eskimos
Jones signed with the Edmonton Eskimos on February 7, 2020.

References

External links
West Georgia Wolves bio
New York Jets bio

1992 births
Living people
American football return specialists
American football wide receivers
Edmonton Elks players
Los Angeles Chargers players
New York Jets players
People from Columbus, Mississippi
Players of American football from Mississippi
West Georgia Wolves football players
Itawamba Indians football players